The following is a timeline of the history of the city of Tangier, Morocco.

Ancient Ages

 42CE – Tingis becomes capital of the Roman province of Mauretania Tingitana.
 429 CE – Vandals take Tingis.

Middle Ages 
 534 - Conquered by the Eastern Roman Empire 
 700s – Arab rule begins.
 927 – Caliphate of Córdoba
 1026 – Taifa of Málaga
 1026 – Taifa of Ceuta
 1078 – Almoravid dynasty rule
 1147 – Almohad dynasty
 1244 – Marinid dynasty (1244–1465).
 1304 – Ibn Battuta is born.
 1437 – Battle of Tangier, attempt by a Portuguese expeditionary force to seize the citadel of Tangier, and their subsequent defeat by the armies of the Marinid sultanate .
 1471 – Portuguese of Tangier rule (1471–1661) begins, under Afonso V of Portugal.
 1580 - Spain in power.
 1656 - Portugal in power again.

Modern Ages 
 1661 – English Tangier (1661–1684), English colonial rule.
 1677 – The English banished all Jews from Tangiers.
 1678 – City besieged by forces of Moulay Ismail.
 1684 – Moroccan rule begins with end of English Tangier.
 1815 – Grand Mosque of Tangier rebuilt.
 1821 – American Legation building in use.
 1844
 6 August: Bombardment of Tangiers (by the French).
 October: Treaty of Tangiers signed in city.
 1883 – Al-Moghreb al-Aksa newspaper begins publication.

20th century

 1904 – Journal de Tanger newspaper begins publication.
 1905
 La Dépêche marocaine newspaper begins publication.
 Anglican Church of St. Andrew consecrated.
 1905/06 - First Moroccan Crisis leading to the Algeciras Conference
 1910 - Population: 40,000 (approximate figure).
 1911 - Agadir Crisis & Treaty of Fes (1912)
 1913 – Gran Teatro Cervantes opens.
 1917 – Sidi Bou Abib Mosque built.
 1920 – Gran Cafe de Paris in business.
 1921 – Café Hafa opens.
 1925 – Tangier International Zone in effect, per Tangier Protocol.
 1937 – Dean's Bar in business.
 1939 – Stade de Marchan (stadium) built.
 1940 – 14 June: City occupied by Spanish forces.
 1945 – 11 October: City returned to international status.
 1947
 Sultan Mohammed V of Morocco gives speech at the Grand Socco.
 American writer Paul Bowles moves to Tangier.
 1948 – Cinema Rif opens.
 1952 – 30 March: Political demonstration.
 1956
 8 October: City becomes part of independent Morocco; Tangier International Zone disestablished.
 1960 – Population: 141,714.
 1973 – Population: 185,850.
 1983 – Ittihad Riadi Tanger football club formed.
 1993 – Population: 307,000 urban agglomeration (estimate).

21st century

 2005 – Rabat–Tangier expressway constructed.
 2003 - Tanger-Med (industrial port complex) supervisory board created.
 2006 – Cinematheque de Tanger opens.
 2008
 Tanger-Med port begins operating near city.
 Tangier Ibn Battouta Airport new terminal building opens.
 2011
 Grand Stade de Tanger (stadium) opens.
 Kenitra–Tangier high-speed rail line construction begins.
 2014 - Population: 998,972 (estimate).
 2015 – City becomes part of the Tanger-Tetouan-Al Hoceima administrative region.

See also
 Tangier history
 Chronology of Tangier 
 List of governors of Tangier, 15th to 17th centuries
 Timelines of other cities in Morocco: Casablanca, Fez, Marrakesh, Meknes, Rabat,

References

This article incorporates information from the French Wikipedia.

Bibliography

Published in 19th century
 

Published in 20th century

  (+ table of contents)
 
 
 

Published in 21st century
 
 
 

  
 Martin Malcolm Elbl. Portuguese Tangier (1471-1662): Colonial Urban Fabric as Cross-Cultural Skeleton (Baywolf Press: Toronto and Peterborough, 2013) .

External links

 
  (Bibliography)
  (Bibliography of open access  articles)
 Map of Tangier, 1943

Tangier
Tangier